The France women's national 3x3 team is the national 3x3 basketball team of France, administered by the Fédération Française de Basketball. It represents the country in international 3x3 (3 against 3) women's basketball competitions.

In April 2021, France was ranked as No.1 in the world. They won 6 of 9 Women's Series 2019 and boasted the top three ranked players in the world in Laetitia Guapo, Migna Touré and Ana Maria Filip.

Tournament record

Summer Olympics

World Cup

See also
France men's national 3x3 team
France mixed national 3x3 team

References

External links

3
Women's national 3x3 basketball teams